Derek Brin is a multi-platinum, award-winning music producer, sound designer, and mix engineer.

Career
Brin, whose father is from St. Thomas and mother is Trinidadian, was born in Toronto, but raised between Toronto and the US Virgin Islands. Before starting his own company, Brin spent 10 years as the in-house Composer, Sound Editor, and Head of Audio Operations at Visual Productions, a film and television production company, based in Toronto and South Africa.

Brin has worked with several of the industry's hottest artists, including Ne-Yo, Dan Hill, Jaheim, RuPaul, Kelly Price, Che'Nelle, Massari, Jane Zhang, Noel G, Dru, Andreea Bălan, Keo, Puya, Keshia Chanté, Kristine W, and Dream Warriors. Brin has been engineer and programmer for hit songwriter Dan Hill since 2004 and programmer for industry heavyweights like Diane Warren (Realsongs), Guy Roche, Jud Friedman, and Allan Rich.

Brin's work has been featured on So You Think You Can Dance, The Hills, Degrassi: The Next Generation, Degrassi Goes Hollywood, Wild Discovery, Supermarket Sweep, The Mom Show, Blue Murder, Psi Factor: Chronicles of the Paranormal, Cover Guy, The NHL Awards, and Fashion File. He also contributed to Pokémon: The First Movie, Save The Last Dance 2, Blue Streak, Smokin' Aces, Poker Night, and Replikator.

Brin founded Fierce Music Entertainment Inc., based in Toronto, Los Angeles, and the Caribbean. He is also CEO and creator of iCaribbeanTunes.com, a major portal where the film, television, and video game industries can go to license music from the Caribbean. In 2007, Brin signed an international publishing deal with Ole Music Publishing. In 2009, Brin was appointed to the board of directors of the Urban Music Association of Canada (UMAC) as Director of Artist Relations.

Selected discography

 One Track Mind by TBTBT (Too Bad to be True) - 1993
 Can I Get A Yo by Graphidi Logik - 1994
 Subliminal Simulation by Dream Warriors - 1994
 Flex by Belinda - 1996
 Do You Know (What It Takes) by Robyn - 1997 (No. 7 Billboard Top 100 single, US gold)
 Pokémon: The First Movie, soundtrack - 1998
 While You Were Gone by Kelly Price (Blue Streak soundtrack) - 1999
 Stamina by Rameses - 1999
 Stronger by Kristine W - 2000 (No. 1 Billboard Dance)
 www.fan-ta-see by Innosense - 2000
 Closer by In Essence - 2003
 Nothing Left To Say by Ryan Malcolm - 2003
 Unconditional by Kalan Porter - 2004
 Unpredictable by Keshia Chanté - 2004 (Canada gold)
 Red Hot by RuPaul - 2004
 Daddy Thing by Jaheim - 2006 (No. 1 entry Billboard Top 200)
 Hungry For Love by Andreea Bălan - 2006
 I Fell In Love With The DJ by Che'Nelle - 2007
 Body Body by Massari - 2009
 Under The Radar by Massari - 2009
 Would You Mind by Dru - 2009

Selected filmography

Film
 Pokémon: The First Movie - 1998
 Blue Streak - 1999
 Save The Last Dance 2 - 2006
 Smokin' Aces - 2006
 Degrassi Goes Hollywood - 2009

TV
 Supermarket Sweep - 1993-2012
 Blue Murder - 2003-2004
 Da Kink in My Hair - 2007-2009
 The Mom Show - 2007-2012
 The Hills - 2008
 So You Think You Can Dance (US) - 2008
 Kanako, Challenging the System (Documentary) - 2009
 Degrassi Goes Hollywood - 2009
 So You Think You Can Dance (Canada) - 2010
 Positive Women (Documentary) - 2012

Awards and nominations

Juno Award
{| class="wikitable"
|-
!Year
!Nominated work
!Award
!Result
|-
|1993
| Devon - Keep It Slammin 
|rowspan="2"| Best Rap Recording of the Year
|
|-
|1994
| TBTBT - One Track Mind 
|
|-
|1994
| Rupert Gayle - The Time Is Right (I'll Be There For You)
|rowspan="3"| Best R&B/Soul Recording of the Year
|
|-
|2004
| In Essence - The Master Plan
|
|-
|2005
| Keshia Chanté - Keshia Chanté
|
|}

International Soca Awards
{| class="wikitable"
|-
!Year
!Nominated work
!Award
!Result
|-
|rowspan="2"| 2006
|rowspan="2"| Derek Brin'''
|Best New Artist - Female
|rowspan="2" 
|-
|Best Female Vocal
|-
|2010
| Derek Brin & Gary Serrao
|Best Soca Compilation Rhythm
|
|}

Brin composed music for the television series, Adventures in Evergreen Forest'', which won a CANPRO Award for Best Children's Programming.

Brin received Canadian Urban Music Awards for Album of the Year and Best R&B Single. In 2004, he was nominated for Producer of the Year.

In 2007, Brin co-produced the song "Beautiful Surprise" for Philip7, which received a nomination for Best Alternative Song at the Barbados Music Awards.

References

External links 
 Derek Brin on Myspace
 
 

Living people
Canadian hip hop record producers
Canadian songwriters
Year of birth missing (living people)